Industrial Sector, Borujerd is a factory and village in Shirvan Rural District, in the Central District of Borujerd County, Lorestan Province, Iran. At the 2006 census, its population was 14, in 4 families.

References 

Towns and villages in Borujerd County